Besanosaurus (meaning "Besano [Lombardy, N. Italy] lizard") is a genus of large ichthyosaur (a marine reptile, not a dinosaur) that lived during the middle Triassic period, approximately 235 million years ago. This marine reptile came from its own family Besanosauridae and was named by Dal Sasso and Pinna in 1996. The type of species is Besanosaurus leptorhynchus meaning "long-beaked reptile from Besano."

Discovery

The bones of Besanosaurus were first discovered in "Sasso Caldo" quarry in the spring of 1993 by the volunteers of the paleontological group of Besano, a small town in the Lombardy region of north Italy. The fossil was almost completely embedded in the rock and could be first seen only through x-rays; to detect the content of the 38 slabs of stone enclosing the skeleton, 145 radiographs were necessary. The skeleton of Besanosaurus came to light in the paleontological laboratory of Museo Civico di Storia Naturale di Milano after 16500 hours of preparation. The preparators removed the rock enclosing the fossil step by step, working under a stereo microscope with chisels, needles and pins. The 38 slabs were reassembled and a silicon rubber matrix was made, from which a cast of the original specimen was obtained.

Description
 
While later ichthyosaurs developed fish-shaped body plans, Besanosaurus was less fish-shaped, bearing a small skull, long trunk and tail, and elongated flippers. Although it was once considered that it did not have a half-moon shaped tail fin and lacked a dorsal fin, at least more primitive Mixosaurus had dorsal fin. Besanosaurus is a large ichthyosaur.

Skull

The skull of Besanosaurus is proportionately small, making up less than 10% of the animal's total length. 67% of the skull's length is occupied by a long, narrow snout, which is strongly demarcated from the rear part of the skull. This elongated snout resembles those of gavials and river dolphins. All of the teeth of Besanosaurus are small, cone-shaped, and set into sockets, with the exception of the rearmost 30% of the teeth in the maxillae (back upper tooth-bearing bones), which are set into a short groove. The tooth crowns bear prominent ridges while the tooth roots bear even stronger ridging. The premaxillae (front upper tooth bearing bones) of Besanosaurus are very long, and extend behind the external nares (nostril openings), where they form part of their border and block the nasal bones from reaching these openings. In addition to the premaxillae, the borders of the external nares are also formed by the maxillae and lacrimals. The maxillae and the prefrontals (a pair of skull roof bones) contact each other. The maxillae do not extend far behind the external nares.

The cheek region of Besanosaurus is short, occupying only 13% of the total skull length. The jugals (bones beneath the eye sockets), are approximately L-shaped. The postorbitals are visible towards the rear of the top of the skull. The frontals (bones in the skull roof) are long, broad, and flat. While the frontals enter the temporal fossae (depressions on top of the skull), they are not involved in the borders of the temporal fenestrae (openings on top of the skull). The front ends of the frontals overlap the nasal bones. The frontals intrude between the parietals and postfrontals (two other pairs of skull roof bones). The quadrates (cranial bones that articulate with the mandible) each bear a triangular projection on their lower inner sides. Besanosaurus has a convex occipital condyle (the part of the skull that connects to the vertebral column). The stapedes (bones in the lower part of the back of the skull) are long, slender, and bear expanded lower ends. The surangulars (rear lower jaw bones forming the upper edge of the mandible) bear prominent emarginations, known as coronoid processes, rising above the rest of their upper edges.

Vertebrae and ribs

Besanosaurus has 60 vertebrae located in front of its hips (presacrals); 11 of these are neck vertebrae. In addition to these vertebrae, there are 2 hip and 139 tail vertebrae. Both the front and back faces of the vertebral bodies (centra) are concave, sloping inwards to a very thin layer of bone if not an opening. The neck vertebrae have prominent zygapophyses (bony projections of the vertebrae) and large, robust neural spines (the blade-like part at the top) with roughly round cross-sections. The roughly rectangular neural spines of the trunk vertebrae are also tall, and are more than half as wide from side to side as they are from front to back. The centra of the trunk vertebrae are at most half as long as tall. The frontmost cervical ribs (those attached to the neck vertebrae) are double-headed, unlike the other, single-headed cervical ribs behind them. The dorsal (trunk) ribs bear grooves along their shafts. The heavily built gastralia (belly ribs) are united along the animal's midline.

About half of the total length of Besanosaurus is composed of its tail. The tail lacks a prominent bend. The neural spines of the tail vertebrae slope backwards, except near its end, where they instead slope forwards. The articular faces of the centra of the tail vertebrae vary in shape; the front ones are roughly triangular, the middle are hexagonal, and the rear are elliptical. The chevrons (bones beneath the tail vertebrae) are not very long. When viewed head-on, they appear Y-shaped.

Appendicular skeleton
The scapulae (shoulder blades) of Besanosaurus are wide and shaped like sickles. Their front lower edges are short and mildly bowed inwards while their upper edges are heavily enlarged. The coracoids (additional shoulder bones below the scapulae) are shaped like axe heads, with their upper margins heavily expanded and their lower ends fan-shaped. The coracoids do not bear openings. The clavicles (collarbones) of Besanosaurus are thin and broadest at their middles. Besanosaurus does not appear to have an interclavicle, an additional shoulder bone between the clavicles. The ilia (upper hip bones) of Besanosaurus are rather wide. The upper ends of the ilia are enlarged and directed inwards, though the lower ends are more heavily expanded. The pubic bones (front lower hip bones) are vaguely circular in shape. They each bear a well-developed foramen that extends to the edge of the bone, forming a notch.

The foreflippers of Besanosaurus are about 15% longer than its hindflippers. Each flipper bears three primary digits (those originating from the wrist or ankle) and one accessory digit (a digit not originating from the wrist or ankle), for a total digit count of four. The humeri (upper arm bones) are very short, being wider than they are long and rounded. Both the front and back edges of the humeri are bowed inwards, though this is stronger and more notch-like on the front edges. The lower arm bones as wide as the are long. The radii (front lower arm bones) have constricted middles and are roughly quadrangular, the ulnae (rear lower arm bones) are rounded and smaller than the radii. The carpals (wrist bones), metacarpals, and manual phalanges (finger bones) are rounded.

The femora (thigh bones) are 1.22 times as long as wide, narrower than the humeri but still very wide and short. The femora have constricted middles, with the midshaft width being somewhat smaller than the breadth of the upper end. The lower leg bones (tibiae and fibulae) have constricted middles and are more elongate than the radii and ulnae. The tibiae are the longer of the two pairs of lower leg bones. The lower ends of the fibulae are heavily expanded. The tarsals (ankle bones), metatarsals, and phalanges of the hindflippers are thinner than the corresponding bones of the foreflippers. The pedal phalanges (toe bones) have constricted middles and are shaped like ellipses.

Paleobiology

It was an eel-like swimmer with moderate speed along with rapid acceleration and good maneuvering, and lived in tropical seas, in coastal, and Caribbean-like environments. Besanosaurs were carnivorous and fed mainly on small fish, cephalopods, and marine reptiles. The reptile's reproduction was ovoviviparous, meaning the eggs incubated inside the body and hatched at birth.

See also
 List of ichthyosaurs
 Timeline of ichthyosaur research

References

External links
 Besanosaurus at Gigadino 

Middle Triassic ichthyosaurs
Fossils of Italy
Middle Triassic reptiles of Europe
Ichthyosauromorph genera